Gilbert M. Savery (October 10, 1917 – November 2, 2018) was an American journalist. He worked for the Lincoln Journal Star from 1941 to 1985. Savery won the Pulitzer Prize in 1949 for his public service efforts.

Early life
Gil Savery was born on October 10, 1917 at Shelby, Nebraska, United States and was raised in Lincoln, Nebraska. Savery enrolled at University of Nebraska–Lincoln after he graduated from Lincoln High School.

Career
Savery began his career and worked as a police reporter in 1941. Savery retired in 1985 as managing editor of the Lincoln Evening Journal. He was appointed into the Nebraska Journalism Hall of Fame in 2005 and received the highest honor available from the Nebraska Press Association — the Master Editor-Publisher Award — in 2010.

Death
Savery died on November 2, 2018 in Lincoln, Nebraska.

References

1917 births
2018 deaths
People from Shelby, Nebraska
University of Nebraska–Lincoln alumni
Journalists from Nebraska
Pulitzer Prize winners
American centenarians
Men centenarians